St. Mary's is a city in Kusilvak Census Area, Alaska, United States. The adjacent village of Andreafsky (historically known as Clear River) joined with St. Mary's in 1980. At the 2010 census the population was 507, up from 500 in 2000. By 2018, the population was estimated to be 567.

Within Saint Mary's there are two federally-recognized tribes the Algaaciq Tribal Government and the Yuupiit of Andreafsky.

Geography
St. Mary's is located at  (62.045305, -163.218629).

Climate

Demographics

Saint Mary's first appeared on the 1960 U.S. Census as an unincorporated village. It was formally incorporated in 1967.

As of the census of 2000, there were 500 people, 137 households, and 90 families residing in the city.  The population density was 11.4 people per square mile (4.4/km2).  There were 186 housing units at an average density of 4.2 per square mile (1.6/km2).  The racial makeup of the city was 11.20% White, 87.20% American Indian/Alaska Native. 0.40% of the population were Hispanic or Latino of any race.

There were 137 households, out of which 45.3% had children under the age of 18 living with them, 40.9% were married couples living together, 17.5% had a female householder with no husband present, and 34.3% were non-families. 28.5% of all households were made up of individuals, and 2.2% had someone living alone who was 65 years of age or older.  The average household size was 3.58 and the average family size was 4.60.

In the city, the age distribution of the population shows 39.6% under the age of 18, 8.6% from 18 to 24, 30.4% from 25 to 44, 15.0% from 45 to 64, and 6.4% who were 65 years of age or older.  The median age was 26 years. For every 100 females, there were 122.2 males.  For every 100 females age 18 and over, there were 111.2 males.

The median income for a household in the city was $39,375, and the median income for a family was $31,875. Males had a median income of $35,313 versus $22,250 for females. The per capita income for the city was $15,837.  About 21.5% of families and 20.4% of the population were below the poverty line, including 28.2% of those under age 18 and 10.3% of those age 65 or over.

See also

Andreafsky Wilderness
Andreafsky River

References

External links
 Andreafsky and Saint Mary's at the Community Database Online from the Alaska Division of Community and Regional Affairs
 Maps from the Alaska Department of Labor and Workforce Development: 2000, 2010

Cities in Alaska
Cities in Kusilvak Census Area, Alaska
Road-inaccessible communities of Alaska
Yukon River